All Angels were a British classical crossover group formed in 2006, consisting of Daisy Chute, Laura Wright, Rachel Fabri, Melanie Nakhla and actress Charlotte Ritchie.

The group's style was classical crossover music and close harmony arrangement, with a repertoire spanning classical, choral, opera and pop including Franz Schubert's Ellens dritter Gesang, Agnus Dei (the choral arrangement of Samuel Barber's Adagio for Strings) and the Sancta Maria intermezzo from Pietro Mascagni's Cavalleria rusticana, along with the Flower Duet from Léo Delibes' Lakmé and the Barcarolle from Jacques Offenbach's The Tales of Hoffmann, plus pop songs such as Robbie Williams' "Angels", Fleetwood Mac's "Songbird", Coldplay's "The Scientist", True Colors, "Goodnight my Angel" (Billy Joel) Muses' "Starlight" and Prince's "Nothing Compares 2 U". They have also performed the UK National Anthem at Twickenham and at the England vs. USA football match in Wembley Stadium in the summer of 2008.

They recorded their first three albums with Universal and have sold over 1 million albums to date. Their self-titled debut album, All Angels, was released in 2006, and their second album, Into Paradise, was released on 26 November 2007. A third album, Fly Away, was released in January 2010. Songs on this album include Norah Jones's "Come Away with Me", "Send In the Clowns", Bob Dylan's "Blowin' in the Wind", Eric Whitacre's "Sleep", and a duet with The Harlem Gospel Choir on "I'll Fly Away".

They undertook a UK tour supporting Katherine Jenkins in Summer 2009 and completed an arena tour later that year with Young Voices. They were invited to perform in Los Angeles as part of the Inspiration Awards raising money for a Breast Cancer charity.

History

All Angels signed a five-album deal with Universal Classics and Jazz in 2006 to be targeted at the populist classical crossover market. Each of the group's members had to go through an audition process to join the group, and were selected from 120 auditionees. Their first live performance was at Cadogan Hall in Chelsea, London.

The group released their self-titled debut album All Angels on 13 November 2006, entering the UK charts at number nine. It was the UK's fastest selling debut for a classical act and won them a platinum disc, and was also nominated in the Classical BRIT Awards album of the year category in 2007. They sang in front of the Queen at the Festival of Remembrance held at the Royal Albert Hall on 9 November and at Silence in the Square, a concert held in Trafalgar Square on 11 November. In December 2006 they released the single "Angels", the first ever Christmas single to be released in association with the Royal British Legion and their Poppy Appeal.

In 2007, they sang at the Classical BRIT Awards ceremony held on 3 May and broadcast on ITV on 6 May. They made a cameo appearance in the British soap opera Emmerdale during a wedding on 9 October 2007 singing "Songbird", and performed the same Summer at the Emmerdale Grampian Fare in Aberdeen for the Anthony Nolan Trust. They again sang at the Festival of Remembrance on 10 November. On 26 November they released a second album, Into Paradise, which features "Nothing Compares 2 U" and "Sancte Deus". At the same time the album was released, the winner was announced of the national Angel Idol competition, run in conjunction with Classic FM to find a fifth member for the group. The winner was Alexandra Lawrie who then had the opportunity to record a track and perform with the girls at a concert in London on 28 November.

They appeared on the BBC Radio 4 2007 Christmas Service, held at Wesley's Chapel in London and on the BBC 2007 New Year's Eve show, singing "Nothing Compares 2 U".

On 14 January 2008, All Angels sang "The Sound of Silence" and "Pie Jesu" in a one-off concert at the International Eisteddfod's launch in Cardiff. On 27 January they appeared on Songs of Praise on BBC One. In 2008, they embarked on a Cathedral tour in the Spring and further touring at open-air concerts venues, including Sandringham and Gawsworth Hall. They also performed for the Make a Wish Foundation Summer Ball at Blenheim Palace. On 11 July, they appeared at the International Eisteddfod in Llangollen.

They went into the recording studio at the end of 2008 and into early 2009 recording tracks for their third album, Fly Away, which was released in 2009.

On 13 October 2009, All Angels performed a concert at Paisley Abbey with the Glasgow-based Les Sirènes Female Chamber Choir as part of the Paisley Choral Festival. The two groups collaborated on the song "I'll Fly Away" as a joint finale. They also performed their own concert at The Thaxted Festival. On 10 December 2009, they participated in the Birmingham Young Voices concert, singing with VV Brown.

All Angels returned for a second year to participate in the Young Voices Tour 2010, which kicked off in Birmingham. In November 2010, All Angels released an EP, titled "Starlight".

In Spring 2011, they performed for the 90th Anniversary for the Royal British Legion in Alicante, Spain.
All Angels were also asked to record the theme to the 2011 UEFA Champions League Final and to perform it at the match at Wembley Stadium between Barcelona and Manchester United.

Members

Daisy Chute
Daisy Chute (born 7 August 1989) is from Edinburgh. She studied at St Mary's Music School Edinburgh, where she was a chorister at St. Mary's Episcopal Cathedral and Loretto School and began her performing career at the age of nine as the young Cosette in the touring production of Les Misérables. At the age of thirteen she appeared as a young Judy Garland in Stars in Their Eyes Kids, and made her first appearance on the Edinburgh Fringe.

At fifteen she recorded her debut album, Simply Jazz after she performed with a trio at a jazz cabaret show at the Edinburgh Jazz and Blues Festival and Edinburgh Fringe. A track from her Simply Jazz album was played by Humphrey Lyttelton on his BBC Radio 2 Best of Jazz show making Chute the youngest performer to ever be showcased on his show. 

Chute finished her secondary schooling at Purcell School in Bushey on a full scholarship, where she studied voice, piano and composition and gained three A's at A level examinations. She then went onto study music at King's College London, graduating in 2011.

In 2005 she was a joint winner of a Scottish songwriting competition for the music festival Burnsong, with her song, Promises to Keep. All the winning songs were performed professionally and broadcast live on BBC Radio Scotland.

After meeting composer Howard Goodall at the Royal Albert Hall's School Proms where she was fronting Loretto School ensemble, she was asked to sing on his television show, How Music Works where she performed the Shaker song "'Tis a Gift to Be Simple" with Anastacia Nosobin on guitar on the first programme of the series. Goodall recommended Chute for inclusion in the group. She also recorded the theme tune for the BBC Radio series What Is Melody written by Richard Niles.

In June 2006 she was a "Highly Commended" finalist in the joint BBC Proms and The Guardian newspaper Young Composer Competition.

On 24 September 2006 she performed at Wigmore Hall in London, giving a solo recital of Alec Wilder songs. She was signed to Universal Classics and Jazz (UCJ) on the day she turned seventeen, as part of All Angels. Chute has also had a brief stint presenting the CBBC news programme, Newsround at the Pop Poll Awards and interviewed Ronan Keating, Billie Piper and Westlife. In summer 2008, she was featured in Highland Heartbeat, a Scottish music special filmed by American broadcaster PBS and broadcast throughout the US in the Spring of 2009. She performed last year touring the music societies as guest vocalist with classical guitarist, Simon Thacker and Camerata Ritmata.

In 2008 Chute won the Scottish Music Centre's Young Composer's competition.

Chute has since returned to her American/Scottish roots and spends most of her time songwriting in the Folk/Americana genre and playing sold-out venues and festivals like Glastonbury. When she's not recording for her own project, you can hear her vocals and orchestrations on countless soundtracks for films, TV shows, games and for bands like Radiohead and Two Door Cinema Club. Working with top orchestras in London (LMO, LCO, LSO) and at top studios (Abbey Road, Air, Angel), she has contributed to soundtracks including The Sims 4, Star Wars Jedi Fallen Order, The Snowman and the Snowdog, Cleaning Up, David Attenborough's Alive at the Natural History Museum, and BAFTA-nominated The Informer, Athena, I Give It a Year, Shaun the Sheep and BAFTA-winning Theeb and Phantom Thread and many more.

She appeared in the Danny Boyle/Richard Curtis feature film Yesterday as an onstage ukulele player at Wembley and vocalist on the soundtrack in 2019.

Chute is the co-founder of HEARD Collective - an artist collective who promote and support women in music, and the co-writer of COVEN  - a gig theatre show about witches set to tour in 2020.

Represented by Talentbanq Agency and an award-winning artist, Chute came first in the Coffee Music Project singer-songwriter competition with her song 'London's on Fire' in 2018 and her 5 most recent singles are being played in over 600 stores worldwide as the Caffe Nero Artist of the Month.

Melanie Nakhla
Melanie Nakhla (born on 29 December 1988) was born in London. She moved with her family to Shrewsbury, Shropshire when she was three years old, where she attended Prestfelde School. She also attended Shrewsbury High School, until the age of 15. She began singing at a young age, joining the Shrewsbury Children's Choir when she was eight years old. She competed in the Oswestry Eisteddfod when she was ten years old coming first in a singing competition. She was a student at Wycombe Abbey in High Wycombe where she was head of choir. She has also appeared at the Royal Opening production of Romany Wood at Severn Theatre in Shrewsbury. 

She graduated from University College London with a degree in French and Spanish. She has performed for the Diamond Jubilee in Shropshire. Melanie has worked at London Hotel, The Chiltern Firehouse since 2014 in an executive capacity. She also hosts a popular video blog about pizza.

Charlotte Ritchie

Charlotte Ritchie (born 29 August 1989) is an English actress and singer-songwriter. She is known for her roles as Alison in Ghosts, Oregon in Channel 4 comedy Fresh Meat, Hannah in Siblings, Alison in Dead Pixels, Barbara Gilbert in BBC drama Call the Midwife, and George in Feel Good.

Laura Wright

Laura Wright (born 17 June 1990) was a member of All Angels and left the group in 2010.

Rachel Fabri

Rachel Fabri (born 12 September 1985) was born in Malta, she trained at the Masquerade Theatre Arts School. She also trained privately under the tuition of soprano Gillian Zammit. Rachel is a Psychology graduate from the University of Malta. She later received a master's degree in Musical Theatre at the Guildford School of Acting. She is an actor as well as a singer, singing all kinds of different styles. Rachel Fabri is the newest member of the group, having joined All Angels in July 2010. Fabri's acting roles have included performances at the Edinburgh Fringe Festival as the lead role in 'Persephone', the London Palladium in 'Me and My Girl' and Abdel Akle in the Lee Tamahori film 'The Devil's Double'. In May 2014 Fabri married Andrew Camilleri. She gave birth to their first child in October 2017, a daughter.

Timeline

Discography

Albums
 2006: All Angels - 13 November
 2007: Into Paradise - 26 November
 2009: Fly Away

EPs
 2010: Starlight

Singles 
 2006: "Songbird"
 2006: "Angels"
 2007: "Nothing Compares 2 U"

Featured 
 2007: The Number One Classical Album 2008 – "Sancte Deus (Nimrod)
 2008: Tenor at the Movies – "Vois Sur Ton Chemin" from Les Choristes with Jonathan Ansell
 2008: A New World – "Anytime Anywhere" with Will Martin

References

External links
All Angels official on Myspace

British vocal groups
Opera crossover singers
Musical groups established in 2006
English pop girl groups